is a Japanese footballer who plays for J1 League club Sagan Tosu, as a defensive midfielder or a centre back.

Club statistics
Updated to 19 July 2022.

References

External links 
 Profile at Ventforet Kofu 
 Profile at Blaublitz Akita 
 
 
 
Shimakawa sings Akita Prefectural Anthem

1990 births
Living people
Association football people from Chiba Prefecture
Japanese footballers
J1 League players
J2 League players
J3 League players
Japan Football League players
Vegalta Sendai players
Tokyo Verdy players
Blaublitz Akita players
Renofa Yamaguchi FC players
Tochigi SC players
Ventforet Kofu players
Oita Trinita players
Association football defenders